Emmanuel Nkosinathi "Nathi" Mthethwa is a South African politician who served as Minister of Sports, Arts and Culture from 2019 until his demotion from cabinet in 2023. He had previously served as the Chief Whip for the African National Congress in the National Assembly in 2008, as Minister for Safety and Security (later known as Minister of Police) from 2008 to 2014, and as Minister of Arts and Culture from 2014 to 2019.  He is from Kwambonambi, KwaZulu-Natal.

Marikana mineworkers' strike

Mthethwa was South Africa's Minister of Police at the time of the August 2012 Marikana Massacre, the most lethal use of force by South African security forces against civilians since 1976. The Marikana Commission of Inquiry led by judge Ian Farlam mentioned Mthethwa's role in the incident several times.

Mthethwa told the Commission in 2014: "What I know is that as the political head at the time, I’d have been responsible for all the things the police were doing".

In its official report, the Commission noted that while Mthethwa's counsel had submitted that he could not "be held liable for the tragic loss of lives at Marikana", the counsel representing some 270 injured or arrested mineworkers had "submitted that the Commission should recommend to the National Director of Public Prosecutions that he should consider prosecuting Minister Mthethwa for the murder of the 34 strikers who were killed on 16 August at Marikana." The Commission did not disagree with the recommendations counsel for the Injured and Arrested Persons as it had with the Counsel's recommendations regarding then Deputy President Cyril Ramaphosa and others, however, it also did not endorse these recommendations.

Mthethwa was not among nine people charged in connection with Marikana in 2018. Farlam himself has since bemoaned the lack of prosecutions, saying: "it was said at the time that we'd exonerated everyone including the minister of police. That wasn't true. We found that the evidence was very inconclusive, we couldn't make a definite finding against the minister of police."

The Commission did find that, in a speech given to members of the South African Police Service (SAPS) on 17 August 2012, Mthethwa gave "what would have been understood to be an unqualified endorsement of the police action" at Marikana. This speech, the Commission found, was "calculated to bring about a closing of the ranks and to discourage any SAPS member who was minded to tell the Commission that things had not gone as well as they must have hoped they would."

References

External links
 

1967 births
Living people
People from KwaZulu-Natal
Zulu people
African National Congress politicians
Government ministers of South Africa
Members of the National Assembly of South Africa
Arts and culture ministers of South Africa